Bear Mountain, in the Lehigh Valley of Pennsylvania several miles above the Lehigh Gap, is a steep-sided east bank ridgeline running about  between the hairpin turn in the Lehigh the Lenape Amerindian people (Delaware people) visualized as a bear's snout, along many water gap gorges, to the steep face dropping down to the Penn Forest Reservoir.

Bear Mountain is the prominent peak opposite the business district of the tourist attractions of Jim Thorpe in Carbon County, once termed being in the heart of "Switzerland of the United States". The former township and borough of East Mauch Chunk was settled outside the hustle and confusion of cross-river boomtown Mauch Chunk

References

Geography of Carbon County, Pennsylvania
Mountains of Pennsylvania
Pocono Mountains